Nematabramis steindachnerii is a species of cyprinid endemic to Borneo. It belongs to the genus Nematabramis.

References

Fish described in 1905
Danios
Nematabramis
Taxa named by Canna Maria Louise Popta